The 2015 by-thirds election to Preston City Council took place on 7 May 2015 as part of the 2015 United Kingdom local elections on the same day (and in the same polling places) as the general election to elect approximately one-third of councillors for a four-year term.

Councillors elected in 2011 Preston City Council election defended their seats this time.  Each ward's election can be directly compared with the 2011 elections or indirectly compared looking at councillors' and candidates' correlations in their own party results to the 2014 Preston City Council election.

Results
All percentage changes are based on the last election for this group of Councillors, which was the 2011 Preston City Council election.

This election's effects on the composition of the council combined with the totals and percentages of votes for the third elected is as follows:

Ward by ward

Ashton

Brookfield

College

Deepdale

Garrison

Greyfriars

Ingol

Larches

Lea

=

Moor Park

Preston Rural East

Preston Rural North

Ribbleton

Riversway

Sharoe Green

St Matthews

Town Centre

Tulketh

University

References

See also
 Preston (UK Parliament constituency)

2015 English local elections
May 2015 events in the United Kingdom
2015
2010s in Lancashire